Benjamin Rosewell may refer to:
 Benjamin Rosewell (attorney) (c. 1720–1782), English attorney
 Benjamin Rosewell (shipwright) (c. 1665–1737), English  master shipwright